Fudbalski klub Torlak is a football club founded in 1962, located in Kumodraž, an urban neighborhood in the municipality of Voždovac, Belgrade, the capital of Serbia.

Honours

Voždovac Trophy: 2016, 2017
Belgrade First League Group C: 2015
Belgrade Third League Group B: 2011

Supporters
The club has a small group of ardent supporters called Nomadi (which means Nomads), who form one of the groups at FK Rad. They have a fierce off-pitch rivalry with neighbours FK Voždovac.

Notable players and managers
Đorđe Kunovac, a former Yugoslav top-flight footballer, managed the club between 2014 and 2016.

References

External links
Facebook page 
Documentary about the club 

Football clubs in Yugoslavia
Association football clubs established in 1962
Football clubs in Belgrade
1912 establishments in Serbia